Ghimbav is a town in Brașov County, Transylvania, central Romania. It is located in the centre of Romania, 5 miles (8 km) west of Brașov.

History

The town was first mentioned in a letter written in 1420 by King Sigismund of Hungary. He advised the inhabitants of Weidenbach/Ghimbav to join their forces together with the people living in three other neighboring Saxon villages (Petersberg/Sânpetru, Honigberg/Hărman and Brenndorf/Bod) and contribute to the construction of the stone fortress of Brașov.

The Ottomans invaded Ghimbav in 1422. In 1469 a major fire damaged the town. In 1611 the Hungarian prince Gabriel Báthory set fire to several villages in Burzenland (Țara Bârsei); Ghimbav was one of them.

The local church and the bell tower were built around 1300. In the 15th century a fortress was built around the church. It was hit by lightning in 1642 and suffered major damages. In 1666 the city hall was moved inside the fortress as well as several other houses. These houses were demolished in 1940. The defensive walls were partially ruined in the 20th century.

Climate
Ghimbav has a warm-summer humid continental climate (Dfb in the Köppen climate classification).

Industry
IAR, a Romanian builder of helicopters and small planes, is located in Ghimbav. Among other aircraft, it builds the Eurocopter/IAR Puma military transport helicopter.

Premium AEROTEC, a subsidiary of EADS, has also built a factory in Ghimbav.

References

Towns in Romania
Populated places in Brașov County
Localities in Transylvania
Burzenland